The 1997–98 Iran 2nd Division football season was played in four groups of ten teams each. The top two teams from each group advanced to the second round, and in second round top four each group - Malavan, Bank Melli, Chooka Talesh and Aboomoslem  - gained promotion to the Azadegan League.

First round

Group 1

Group 2

Group 3

Group 4

Second round

Group 1

References 

 www.rsssf.com

League 2 (Iran) seasons
Iran
2